I with tilde (И̃ и̃; italics: И̃ и̃) is a letter of the Cyrillic script.

I with tilde is used in the Khinalug and Godoberi language where it represents a nasalized close front unrounded vowel /ĩ/. It is a variant of the Cyrillic letter И and is very similar to the Latin letter Ñ. it  also might have been used as i with titlo in church slavonic.(◌҃И/◌҃І)

See also
Ĩ ĩ : Latin letter Ĩ
Cyrillic characters in Unicode

References

Cyrillic letters with diacritics
Letters with tilde